Beauty and the Beach is a 1941 American short musical film directed by Leslie M. Roush. It was nominated for an Academy Award at the 14th Academy Awards for Best Short Subject (One-Reel).

Cast
 Johnny Long as Orchestra Leader

References

External links
 

1941 films
1941 musical films
1941 short films
American musical films
American short films
American black-and-white films
Paramount Pictures short films
1940s English-language films
1940s American films